Alexander Andersson (born 14 December 1985) is a retired Swedish footballer who played as a forward.

Career
In June 2016, Andersson signed for NASL side Jacksonville Armada FC, returning to Degerfors prior to the start of the 2017 Superettan season.

Andersson retired after the 2018 season.

Career statistics

References

External links

1985 births
Living people
Association football forwards
Swedish footballers
Superettan players
North American Soccer League players
Degerfors IF players
Jacksonville Armada FC players
Swedish expatriate footballers
Expatriate soccer players in the United States